Zinder (locally, Damagaram), formerly also spelled Sinder, is the third largest city in Niger, with a population of 170,574 (2001 census); by the 2012 census its population reached 235,605.

History

Early history

Zinder was originally the site of the small Hausa village of Zengou. The town grew dramatically in importance following the arrival of Kanuri aristocrats in 1736, who built a new fortified quarter called Birni to the south and declared the town of Zinder as the capital of the Sultanate of Damagaram in 1736. Thereafter Zinder became an important centre of the Trans-Saharan trade and a major hub for trade south through Kano and east to Bornu. The sultanate remained nominally subject to the Borno Empire until the reign of Sultan Tanimoune Dan Souleymane in the mid-to-late 19th century, who declared independence and initiated a phase of vigorous expansion.

Europeans began exploring the region in the 19th century, beginning with German explorer Heinrich Barth, who stayed in Zinder in 1851, and later the French explorer Marius Gabriel Cazemajou, who was killed in the city in 1897. It was then, after a brief resistance, occupied in July 1899 by Lt. Pallier of the Voulet-Chanoine mission. The French barracks was called Fort Cazemajou and it served as the capital of the Niger Military Territory upon its creation in 1911. In 1926, following fears of Hausa revolts and improving relations with the Djerma of the west, the capital was transferred back to the village of Niamey.

Upon Niger's independence from France, the town's fort was renamed for Sultane Tanimoune.

Recent history
In 2003, telecommunications company Celtel arrived in Zinder, building a mobile phone tower and selling prepaid phone cards to residents. This arrival of the mobile phone drastically changed the predominant modes of communication in the city, allowing traders to have a faster and more affordable means of communicating with buyers and sellers. This is an example of how cellular towers in the developing world have begun to transform the market.

Geography

The centre of Zinder consists of three main areas: in the north is Zengou or Zango, the old Tuareg suburb, is known for its vernacular architecture, and in the south lies Birni, the old Hausa town, which is home to Zinder Great Mosque, Fort Tanimoune and the Sultan's Palace, as well as a museum. Sabon Gari (the new town), lies between Birni and Zengou,  and is the commercial centre, known for its large market (the Grand Marché). The city now sprawls to the north and west, extending to the Karkada section, in the north; other neighbourhoods include Garin Mallam and Gawon Kollia.

The city has many distinctive granite rocks which can result in standing water during the rainy season, though the city has a long history of water shortages. Recently water was piped by a Chinese-owned company from the north to provide water to most of the city, however, this problem is likely to continue due to expected population growth. 

The city is divided into 5 urban municipalities: Zinder I, Zinder II, Zinder III, Zinder IV and Zinder V.

Demographics 

The population of Zinder City has quadrupled from around 50,000 inhabitants in 1977 to over 200,000 people in 2012.

Transport
Zinder Airport (code: ZND) is located a few kilometres southwest of the town.

Economy
The economy of the city is still largely based on the agricultural activities of the surroundings. Today, the city counts four officially recognised industries: Tannerie Malam Yaro (leather tanning), Gidan Alkaki (cake production), Sahara Sahel Foods (processing of non-wood forest produce) and SORAZ (petrol refinery located 50km North of the city). In November 2011, Niger Republic's first oil refinery was commissioned in Zinder.

Notable residents
Moussa Hamadou Djingarey (born 1973), film director

Gallery

References

Bibliography
 James Decalo. Historical Dictionary of Niger. Scarecrow Press/ Metuchen. NJ – London (1979) 
 Finn Fuglestad. A History of Niger: 1850–1960. Cambridge University Press (1983) 
 Jolijn Geels. Niger. Bradt UK/ Globe Pequot Press USA (2006)

External links

 
Zinder Region
Populated places in Niger